The Symbiosis Society is a family of 64 educational institutions on 19 campuses in India hosting 34,000 students. It manages the Symbiosis International University (SIU), formerly Symbiosis International Education Centre. It was established in 1971 by S. B. Mujumdar, who serves as the president, and is headed by Vidya Yeravdekar.

Constituent institutes 
Institutes within the society include:

Schools
 Symbiosis Primary & Secondary School, Pune
 Symbiosis International School, Pune
 Symbiosis Nursery School, Pune
 Symbiosis Day Care Centre, Pune
 Symbiosis Open School, Pune
 Symbiosis School, Harali
 Symbiosis Kindergarten, Nashik
 Symbiosis School, Nashik

University and its constituents*
*(this list might be incomplete)
 Symbiosis International University 
 Symbiosis Institute of Technology (SIT, Pune)
Symbiosis Institute of Design (SID, Pune)
Symbiosis Skills and Professional University (SSPU, Pune, Maharashtra)
Symbiosis Institute of Business Management (SIBM, Pune, Maharashtra)
Symbiosis School of Photography
Symbiosis School of Biological Sciences
Symbiosis Institute of International Studies
Symbiosis School of Liberal Arts
Symbiosis School of Culinary Arts
Symbiosis School of Banking and Finance
Symbiosis School of Planning, Architecture and Design (Nagpur).
Symbiosis School of Planning and Architecture.
Symbiosis School of Sports Sciences
Symbiosis Institute of Media and Communication (SIMC, Bengaluru Urban, Karnataka)
Symbiosis Institute of Media and Communication (SIMC, Pune, Maharashtra)
Symbiosis School of Nursing (Jaipur, Rajasthan)
 Symbiosis Center for Management and Human Resource Development (SCMHRD, Pune)
 Symbiosis Centre for Information Technology (SCIT, Pune)
 Symbiosis Law School (SLS) (Pune, Noida, Hyderabad and Nagpur )
 Symbiosis Institute of Management Studies, Pune (SIMS)
 Symbiosis Institute of International Business (SIIB)
 Symbiosis Institute of Telecom Management
 Symbiosis Statistical Institute (SSI, Pune)
 Symbiosis Institute of Operations Management
 Symbiosis Institute of Geoinformatics (SIG, Pune)
 Symbiosis Institute of Computer Studies and Research
 Symbiosis School of Economics

College
 Symbiosis College of Arts and Commerce, Pune

References

External links 
 

 
Educational organisations based in India
Education in Pune
1971 establishments in Maharashtra
Educational institutions established in 1971